Leucadendron brunioides, the foetid conebush, is a species of plant in the family Proteaceae. It was first described in 1856 by Carl Meissner.

Description
Leucadendron brunioides is endemic to sandy flats and shrublands of South Africa. The species survives wildfires. Flowers are dioecious and pollinated by insects.

Varieties
There are two varieties recognized under L. brunioides.
Leucadendron brunioides var. brunioides
Leucadendron brunioides var. flumenlupinum

References

brunioides
Taxa named by Carl Meissner
Plants described in 1856